François Proth (22 March 1852 – 21 January 1879) was a French self-taught mathematician farmer who lived in Vaux-devant-Damloup near Verdun, France.

He stated four primality-related theorems. The most famous of these, Proth's theorem, can be used to test whether a Proth number (a number of the form k2n + 1 with k odd and k < 2n) is prime. The numbers passing this test are called Proth primes; they continue to be of importance in the computational search for large prime numbers.

Proth also formulated Gilbreath's conjecture on successive differences of primes, 80 years prior to Gilbreath, but his proof of the conjecture turned out to be erroneous.

The cause of Proth's death is not known.

Publications
. 
. 
. 
.

References

1852 births
1879 deaths
19th-century French mathematicians